The Man from the Train is a 2017 true crime book written by Bill James and his daughter Rachel McCarthy James.

In The Man from the Train, the authors claim to have discovered the identity and existence of a previously overlooked serial killer active in the late 1800s and early 1900s. According to the authors, this criminal was named Paul Mueller, who operated throughout North America and killed a minimum of 59 people and possibly over 100. 

Bill James is best known as a baseball analyst using sabermetrics, but also writes about crime, having previously published Popular Crime: Reflections on the Celebration of Violence (2012).

Summary
Bill James' research began with an attempt to solve one famous unsolved crime, the Villisca axe murders, in which a family of six and two house guests were slaughtered in Villisca, Iowa, on the night of June 9, 1912. James suspected a possible serial killer based on what seemed like the actions of a practiced criminal at Villisca. He found some similar crimes in period newspapers and brought on his daughter Rachel McCarthy James who found more. McCarthy James was originally hired as a research assistant, but by her own estimate wrote roughly ten percent of the book and thus was credited as a co-author.

Via research in newspaper archives the Jameses discovered scores of murders of entire families, committed from 1898 to 1912. These crimes occurred in Nova Scotia, Oregon, Kansas, Florida, Arkansas, and other locations, some of which they ascribe to Mueller. Though many of these crimes earned significant publicity, they have mostly faded from attention apart from the Villisca murders.

Mueller's name was apparently linked to only one crime in contemporary media. He was the subject of an unsuccessful yearlong manhunt as the sole suspect in the 1897 murder of a family near West Brookfield, Massachusetts, who had employed him as a farmhand. According to Rachel McCarthy James, she and her father unearthed "probably 500 words of material about Mueller, specifically his physical appearance, where he’s from, his skills and his family." Mueller was about 35 years old in 1897, reportedly claimed to be a German military veteran, and was known as a skilled carpenter who spoke very little English. He was described as short and muscular in stature, with unusually small and widely spaced teeth his most distinctive feature. Mueller is believed to most likely have worked as an itinerant lumberjack, given his woodworking skills, the killer's use of an axe, and the fact that most of the murders occurred in or near logging areas.

The Jameses point out that in these times, local police usually assumed a local murderer with some connection to the victims. The concept of a nationwide traveling serial killer was never even considered in most cases, and this led to a serial murderer possibly being missed. Police investigative methods and technology were primitive compared to a few decades later (e.g., neither fingerprints nor blood typing were in wide use), and crime scenes were often compromised by curious onlookers. The authors believe at least eight people were wrongly convicted for Mueller's crimes (four of whom were executed and one later exonerated), while seven people were lynched (mostly but not entirely African-Americans), while another ten were arrested but later released due to lack of evidence or strong alibis.

According to the Jameses, a number of murders in the period which were assumed by local police to be one-off incidents were actually committed by a single person, probably Mueller, based on about thirty similarities, many of which feature in most of these crimes. These similarities include the scene being within a short walk from a railroad junction where Mueller was suspected to have fled by freighthopping (thus the book's title); the slaughter of entire families late at night in small towns with little or no police force; the families having a barn where the killer was believed to have hidden to observe the families; the families having no dog to warn of an intruder; the killer using the blunt edge of an axe as a murder weapon; the killer leaving the axe in plain sight; the killer covering victims with sheets or blankets prior to the murders (probably to prevent blood spatter); the killer moving or stacking bodies after the murders; the killer covering windows from inside the house with sheets or towels; and the absence of robbery with cash or jewelry undisturbed at the scene. In early cases the killer often attempted arson to destroy the house, but gradually abandoned the practice possibly because it more quickly brought attention to the scene. A killer or killers known as the Axeman of New Orleans was active in 1918 and 1919, but the authors believe these crimes are unconnected to Mueller due to different characteristics at the crime scenes (e.g. the New Orleans victims were all adults and were killed with the blade of an ax). However, the authors believe some of the 1911-1912 murders attributed to Clementine Barnabet were likely committed by Mueller. 

The killer's primary motive is believed to have been a sadistic sexual attraction to pre-pubescent girls, factoring in a majority of the killings. While adults were typically ambushed and murdered in bed while sleeping, girls often showed defense wounds or other evidence of struggle. Media reports of the crimes often included veiled references to the killer having ejaculated at the crime scenes or his having molested the girls after death. The presence of a slab of bacon at the Villisca scene, possibly used as a masturbation aid, may bolster this theory according to the authors.

Bill James noted that nationwide from 1890 to 1912 there was an average of eight murdered families per year, most of which do not share the characteristics reported in media for the crimes attributed to Mueller. Furthermore, crimes with the collection of 30 traits listed above stopped abruptly after 1912. A statistician in his baseball work, James contends it is more likely the crimes fitting the Mueller profile are connected than not due to the idiosyncratic characteristics. A lack of such crimes anywhere in the nation for about a year in 1908 led the Jameses to speculate that the killer was apprehended and imprisoned for a minor crime.

The Jameses describe themselves as feeling certain that Mueller committed 14 family murders totaling 59 victims, and less certain to varying degrees of his involvement in another 25 family murders totaling an additional 94 victims. If accurate, these totals would place Mueller/The Man from The Train either just behind or ahead of Samuel Little, the American serial killer with the most confirmed victims, who was convicted of 60 murders and claimed 93.

The authors also suggest that Mueller may have been responsible for the 1922 Hinterkaifeck murders in Germany. The murders bear some similarities to the U.S. crimes, including the slaughter of an entire family in their isolated home, the bodies being moved after the killings, a young girl among the victims, use of the blunt edge of a farm tool as a weapon (a pick axe), and the apparent absence of robbery as a motive. The authors suspect that Mueller, described as a German immigrant in contemporary media, might have departed the US for his homeland after private investigators and journalists began to notice and publicize patterns in family murders across state lines. Due in part to improved communication technology, observers increasingly noted similarities between the crimes. Nationwide attention came following the brazen 1911 murder of two families in a single night in Colorado Springs, Colorado, and a similar family murder weeks afterward a few hundred miles away in neighboring Kansas. By the 1912 Villisca murders, it was widely suspected a single traveling assailant might be to blame (though the term "serial killer" was not used until decades later).

Reception
In a review for The New York Journal of Books, Bill McClug described The Man from the Train as "an interesting and fascinating albeit rather unknown story, and it is commendable that the authors have chosen to bring it to light." But he also criticized the writing style as overly casual and thought it unlikely that the Jameses' case could be conclusively proved after a century.

Kirkus Reviews gave the book a positive review: "Told in workmanlike, journalistic prose with plenty of personal injections—'hear me out. Have I got a story to tell you'—the narrative becomes addictive, and it’s easy to get caught up in the elaborate search and the authors’ conclusions, which are plausible."

In a blurb on the dust jacket for the book's hardcover edition, professor Harold Schecter states the Jameses offered the most plausible explanation to date for the Villisca murders.

See also 
 List of serial killers in the United States

References

External links
Q&A interview with Bill James on The Man from the Train, February 4, 2018, C-SPAN

2017 non-fiction books
American non-fiction books
Books by Bill James
Non-fiction books about murders in the United States
Non-fiction books about serial killers
Serial murders in the United States
Unidentified serial killers
Axe murder
Charles Scribner's Sons books